Chetnole railway station is a small rural station serving the village of Chetnole, Dorset, England.

History
The station was opened on 11 September 1933, being originally built of timber. This was replaced by a concrete structure, believed to be in the 1960s. The line was converted to a single track in 1968.

Facilities 
Chetnole only has the most basic facilities, being a small waiting area (including a payphone), a help point, bike racks and some information boards including timetable posters. There is no step-free access.

Services

The station is a request stop, meaning passengers wishing to board a train need to signal clearly to the driver as the train approaches.

References

Bibliography

External links
 Station on navigable O.S. map
 Chetnole - Least Used Station in Dorset 2017 YouTube video by Geoff Marshall about the station.

Railway stations in Dorset
Former Great Western Railway stations
Railway stations in Great Britain opened in 1933
Railway stations served by Great Western Railway
Railway request stops in Great Britain
DfT Category F2 stations